MacGregor State High School (MSHS) is an independent public, co-educational, state secondary school, located in MacGregor, a southeastern suburb of Brisbane, Queensland Australia. The current principal is Brendan Barlow and there are currently around 1,400 students who are enrolled in the school.

History 
MacGregor State High School was officially opened on 5 July 1969 by the Honourable Mr S.D. Tooth M.L.A, Minister for Health with nine teachers and 203 students.

The school originally consisted of 2 classroom blocks which incorporated learning spaces, the library, Tuckshop, office accommodation and facilities for staff and students. The initial building program saw provisions made for and oval and both tennis and basketball courts on the 25.5 perch allocation of land.

MacGregor has a proud Scottish heritage. Mrs Jean Mcgreger-Lowndes was the school's first patron, and many of the school's icons and emblems reflect this heritage, including the Clans (roll classes/house groups) - Alpin, Duncun, Gregor and Rob Roy; the tartan of the uniforms and the first school motto 'S Rioghal Mo Dhream' (Royal is My Race).

On Black Sunday, 4 November 1973 at 6:30 PM a tornado struck the school, causing hundred of thousands of dollars of damage with much of the school having to be rebuilt. On such dark occasions, Mrs McGregor-Lowndes would quote from Sir Walter Scott's, "MacGregors' Gathering":

"While there's leaving in the forest, and foam on the river,
MacGregor, despite them, shall flourish for ever!"

Sport 
As with most Australian schools, MacGregor State High utilises a house system, of which is referred to as a 'clan system'. There are currently four clans - Alpin (Blue), Duncan (Yellow), Gregor (Green) and Rob Roy (Red).

Awards 
In recent years, the school has won awards in a variety of fields.  There were the Education Minister's Awards for Excellence in Art (2004, 2006), the BHP Billiton Science Award (Physics, Engineering & Technology) (2001) and the Queensland Youth Music Awards (2006).

Academic 
MacGregor have competed in Maths Team challenge every year placing 2nd in the 2007 Junior and Senior division. MacGregor State High School also competes in local academic competitions such as the Physics Olympiad and Big Science Challenge.

Notable people

Faculty
 Kirby Short, school deputy principal and former professional cricketer.

Alumni
 Daniel Amalm, guitarist and actor.
 Pierre Boda, winter Olympian and speed skater.
 Greg Creed, businessman and CEO of YUM! Brands.
 Sarah Fitz-Gerald, professional squash player.
 Gary Hardgrave, politician; former MP for Moreton and Administrator of Norfolk Island; member of the Liberal Party of Australia
 Jeff Horn, professional boxer
 Sophie Monk, singer, actress, and model.
 Jung Ryeo-won, Korean-Australian singer and actress.
 The Spierig Brothers (Peter Spierig and Michael Spierig), film directors, screenwriters, and film producers.
 Bronwyn Thompson, long jumper.

See also 

 Education in Australia
 List of schools in Queensland

References

External links 
  Official site
 School Listing - Department of Education (QLD)

 
Public high schools in Brisbane
Educational institutions established in 1969
1969 establishments in Australia